The 1884 Republican National Convention was a presidential nominating convention held at the Exposition Hall in Chicago, Illinois, on June 3–6, 1884. It resulted in the nomination of former House Speaker James G. Blaine from Maine for president and Senator John A. Logan of Illinois for vice president. The ticket lost in the election of 1884 to Democrats Grover Cleveland and Thomas A. Hendricks.

In attendance were 1600 delegates and alternates and 6000 spectators. There were 820 official delegates; 411 votes were needed to win the nomination. The incumbent president, Chester A. Arthur, was not a serious contender due to ill health. Blaine was the favorite going in, but there was a possibility that President Arthur could build a coalition with smaller candidates such as George F. Edmunds. There were also rumors that members of the party would bolt if Blaine won the nomination. Neither Blaine nor Arthur were in attendance. Blaine was at his home in Augusta, Maine, and Arthur followed the events from the White House by telegraphy.

Pre-balloting maneuvers 
To test the waters, Blaine supporters nominated Powell Clayton as temporary chair of the Convention. A former Arthur supporter, Clayton was now in Blaine's camp. He was popular with veterans, but was also associated with the Star Route Frauds. Edmunds's supporters, led by Henry C. Lodge, moved to nominate John R. Lynch instead, an African-American from Mississippi. The speech supporting Lynch was given by Theodore Roosevelt. Lynch won the vote 424 to 384, and Blaine's nomination seemed for the first time vulnerable.

Blaine's future seemed more vulnerable the next day when, to address the rumors of party members bolting, his supporters made a motion to remove seats of delegates who failed to pledge support of the eventual nominee. The motion failed, again by the fortitude of Edmunds's supporters. The day closed with John B. Henderson being elected permanent chair of the convention.

That evening leaders of Arthur's and Edmunds's camps met in private in the Grand Pacific Hotel and tried to create a viable coalition. Arthur's team could not guarantee that his supporters would back Edmunds. It was more likely that the second choice of Arthur delegates was Blaine.

Presidential nomination

Presidential candidates

Declined to contest 
 Secretary of War Robert Todd Lincoln from Illinois
 General William Tecumseh Sherman from Ohio
 Lieutenant General Philip Sheridan from New York

The roll call of the States began the next evening. When Maine was called, the cheering lasted ten minutes, during which time William H. West came to the platform and gave a rabble-rousing speech to second the nomination. After West's speech, pandemonium continued in the building, much to West's chagrin. Further speeches seconding the nomination were given by Cushman Kellogg Davis and Thomas C. Platt.

When the roll call reached New York, it was Arthur's turn to be nominated. Martin I. Townsend's speech was lackluster at best and poorly prepared, Townsend having been selected for the responsibility only after the roll call began. His speech was occasionally drowned out by hisses and eruptions of side conversations. The nomination was seconded by Harry H. Bingham, John R. Lynch and Patrick H. Winston. Bingham's speech was strong, Lynch's brief, and Winston's irritating. Although it was already 11 PM, a motion to adjourn failed. Another speech for Arthur was given by P. B. S. Pinchback, but like the others, it did not sway any support.

To close the night Joseph B. Foraker nominated John Sherman and John Davis Long nominated Edmunds. The delegates adjourned just after midnight.

On the morning of June 6, balloting began.

On the first ballot Blaine received 334½, Arthur 278, Edmunds 93, Logan 63½, and Sherman 30, with Joseph Roswell Hawley, Robert Todd Lincoln and William Tecumseh Sherman receiving parts of the remainder. Arthur received only a third of his votes from the North, none from Ohio, 1 of 44 from Illinois, 9 of 30 from Indiana, 11 of 60 from Pennsylvania and only 31 of 72 from his home state of New York. It was expected that Logan's delegates would shift to Blaine.

On the third ballot, Blaine received 375 (gaining delegates from Edmunds), Arthur 274. On the fourth ballot, Blaine received 541, Arthur 207, and Edmunds 41. Blaine received 130 more than the majority needed, grabbing 67 from Arthur's camp and 28 from Edmunds's.

{| class="wikitable sortable" style="text-align:center"
! colspan="5" | Presidential Ballot
|-
! Candidate !!1st !! 2nd !! 3rd !! 4th
|-
!Blaine
|style="background:#fbb;"|334.5
|style="background:#fbb;"|349
|style="background:#fbb;"|375
|style="background:#fbb;"|541
|-
!Arthur *|style="background:#fdd;"|278
|style="background:#fdd;"|276
|style="background:#fdd;"|274
|style="background:#fdd;"|207
|-
!Edmunds
|style="background:#fee;"|93
|style="background:#fee;"|85
|style="background:#fee;"|69
|style="background:#fee;"|41
|-
!Logan
|63.5
|61
|53
|7
|-
!J. Sherman
|30
|28
|25
|style="background:#d3d3d3"|0
|-
!Hawley
|13
|13
|13
|15
|-
!Lincoln
|4
|4
|8
|2
|-
!W. T. Sherman
|2
|3
|2
|style="background:#d3d3d3"|0
|-
!Not Voting
|2
|1
|1
|7
|}Presidential Balloting / 4th Day of Convention (June 6, 1884) Vice Presidential nomination 
 Vice Presidential candidates 

In the evening of the day of Blaine's nomination, Logan was selected to be the Republican vice presidential nominee.Vice Presidential Balloting / 4th Day of Convention (June 6, 1884)' See also 
 List of Republican National Conventions
 1884 United States presidential election
 U.S. presidential nomination convention
 History of the United States Republican Party
 1884 Democratic National Convention

 References 

 Bibliography 

 

 External links 
 Republican Party platform of 1884 at The American Presidency Project
 Official Proceedings of the Republican National Convention Held at Chicago, June 3, 4, 5, and 6, 1884''

1884 conferences
1884 in Illinois
1884 United States presidential election
June 1884 events
Political conventions in Chicago
Republican National Conventions